Quatre-vingt-treize is a French silent film based on a novel Ninety-Three by Victor Hugo and directed by André Antoine, Albert Capellani and Léonard Antoine from year 1920.

Cast 
 Charlotte Barbier-Krauss: Michelle Flécharde 
 Paul Capellani: Gauvain 
 Max Charlier: Imanus 
 Georges Dorival: Radoub 
 Philippe Garnier: Marquess de Lantenac 
 Henry Krauss: Cimourdain 
 Maurice Schutz: Grandcoeur

External links

1920 films
Films based on works by Victor Hugo
Films directed by Albert Capellani
French Revolution films
Films set in the 1790s
French silent feature films
French black-and-white films
1920s French films